Kakkala is a Southern Dravidian language of Kerala, India. It is unclassified but is probably one of the Malayalam languages or one of the Tamil languages.

References

Malayalam language
Tamil languages